HG 76 (19 to 23 December 1941) was an Allied convoy of the HG (Homeward from Gibraltar) series, during the Second World War. It was notable for the destruction of five German U-boats (the true total was not known to the British until after the war).

Two Focke-Wulf Condor long-range reconnaissance aircraft were shot down by Martlet fighters. The fighter cover was provided by the escort carrier , which was sunk during the voyage along with a destroyer and two merchant ships. Despite the loss of the escort carrier, it was regarded as the first big convoy victory for the Allies in the Battle of the Atlantic.

Background
The attack on HG 76 was the last in a series of U-boat pack attacks on Gibraltar convoys which had started in the summer of 1941. Before this the U-boat Arm (UBW) had only enough boats operational to form one patrol line at a time and their focus was on the North Atlantic convoy route. Gibraltar convoys had suffered only occasional adventitious attacks by individual U-boats that had met them while crossing their route. By the summer 1941 U-boat Command (BdU) had sufficient boats to form several patrol lines but this coincided with Hitler ordering U-boats into the Mediterranean to support Axis forces operating in North Africa and attack the Gibraltar traffic. This phase of the campaign had commenced with a pack attack on OG 69.

For the Allies the introduction of stable escort groups had created the conditions the development of convoy protection tactics, giving a measure of success in countering the wolf pack threat. It was recognized that air cover was needed to counter shadowing aircraft and to seek out approaching U-boats and for reinforcement to convoys under attack to provide sufficient ships to hunt U-boats to destruction rather than simply driving them off, as so often happened. The first requirement was met with the commissioning of HMS Audacity, the first in a series of merchant aircraft carriers, the second by reinforcing the escorts and by the formation of an ASW Strike Force at Gibraltar, which would sweep ahead of a homeward bound convoy, to attack and destroy patrolling U-boats. The new measures had been introduced by the time HG 76 sailed.

Prelude

HMS Audacity

Audacity participated in the escort of convoy OG 76 of twenty merchant ships, which sailed from Liverpool for Gibraltar on 31 October. The escort carrier embarked 802 Naval Air Squadron (802 NAS) of the Fleet Air Arm with eight Martlets and ten pilots. The fighters were usually split into standing patrols of two aircraft, which flew over the convoy for about two hours, searching for U-boats and Condors, the danger mainly coming from deck landings. The weather was atrocious and at times pitched the flight deck  and rolled it through  spray swept over the deck. Two Martlets took off on patrol and one managed a safe landing but the other touched down when the stern was rising and was thrown overboard, the pilot being rescued just before the Martlet sank.

On 8 November, Kampfgeschwader 40 (KG 40) sent six Focke-Wulf Condor aircraft to locate convoy SL 91, bound for Liverpool from Freetown, Sierra Leone. Near noon, the radar on Audacity detected two of the Condors and a Martlet patrol was sent to intercept. One Condor escaped into a cloud but two Martlets caught the second, which shot down one Martlet before being shot down by the other Martlet. About three hours later, another Condor was shot down by a Martlet making a head-on attack and a fourth Condor escaped. KG 40 had lost a third of its operational aircraft and failed to direct any U-boats onto either convoy, OG 76 making a safe arrival at Gibraltar late on 11 November. The presence of Audacity was now known to KG 40 and to BdU.

HG 76

HG 76 comprised 32 ships homeward bound from Gibraltar, many in ballast or carrying trade goods. The Convoy Commodore was Vice-Admiral R. Fitzmaurice in the steamship Spero. The convoy had a strong escort, consisting of 36th Escort Group (Commander F. J. "Johnnie" Walker), usually composed of two  sloops ( and ) and seven corvettes (Convolvulus, Gardenia, Marigold, Pentstemon, Rhodedendron, Samphire and Vetch). Walker, a skilled anti-submarine warfare expert, had taken command of EG 36 in October and  brought the group down to Gibraltar in November with OG 76. He had exercised the group there in anti-submarine patrols that had resulted in the destruction of U-433 by Marigold. This made a total escort of 17 warships.

Since August 1940, Dönitz had ended the practice of U-boats freelancing and sending only one report per day. U-boat commanders were ordered to signal whenever they found a convoy and shadow it rather than attack. The commander was to send short homing signals every thirty minutes, to guide other U-boats to the convoy. When the pack had assembled, Dönitz gave the order to attack, usually at night, so that the U-boats could fire their torpedoes on the surface. For the tactic to work, U-boats had to signal their positions to Dönitz at Kerneval (across the river from the submarine base at Lorient in Brittany). Closer to land, when Condors on tracking patrol sighted a convoy, the wireless operator reported its position and course to the BdU and relays of Condors remained over the convoy. When the position of a convoy was established, the information was passed to the senior officer of a group of U-boats organised for pack attacks, who ordered the boat nearest to the convoy to shadow it and guide the rest by wireless. When the pack had rendezvoused near the convoy, surface attacks would be made on successive nights, the U-boats withdrawing during the day.

In mid December U boat Command was informed that a convoy was assembling at Gibraltar. German agents stationed in the Spanish city of Algeciras, in neutral Spain, were able to overlook the harbour and report any and all activity there, without hindrance from the Axis-friendly Spanish authorities.
BdU began to assemble a patrol line, code-named  (Pirate), preparatory to launching a pack attack.  was an  group, as the previous , had disbanded following a fruitless pursuit of southbound OS 12.
 comprised seven U-boats; U-67 was already in position after a failed attack on OG 77;  U-434 and U-574 from  had refuelled from a clandestine depot ship in Vigo harbour, U-127 and U-131 had arrived from Germany and U-107 and U-108 from bases in France. Five of the seven were Type IX boats, which Dönitz considered unsuitable for pack attacks and five of the seven crews were inexperienced, being on their first patrols. The pack had orders to sink Audacity at all costs and was reinforced later by three more boats; U-108 sank a Portuguese freighter sailing independently on 14 December.

Battle

14–15 December

HG 76 sailed from Gibraltar on 14 December 1941, in company with a small convoy bound for Cape Town, and was reported almost immediately by German agents across the bay in neutral Spain, who reported the composition, escort strength and departure time of the convoy; BdU was confused by an agent report that the convoy had returned to port. The first sightings of HG 76 were made by U-74 and U-77, both  to the Mediterranean and about to transit the Straits. U-77 sank one ship from the Cape Town convoy, but U-74 was unable to attack HG 76; Fairey Swordfish aircraft of RAF Gibraltar Command were escorting the convoy and on three occasions during the night of  drove off the U-boats. The  boats formed a patrol line south of Cape St Vincent but HG 76 passed through the line without detection. At  Lockheed Hudson and Consolidated Catalina aircraft took over from the Swordfish and for the next two days co-operated with the 802 NAS Martlets on Audacity, forcing U-boats to submerge.

16–18 December
At noon on 16 December, HG 76 was sighted and its position reported by a Focke-Wulf Condor of I/KG 40 patrolling from Bordeaux, which guided U-108 to the convoy to begin reporting its position to other U-boats. During the night of  the wolf pack closed in and U-574 was ordered to the area; by morning on 17 December, the convoy had passed beyond the range of Gibraltar-based aircraft and four U-boats made contact, U-67 and U-108 being forced away from the convoy. At  on 17 December, Stanley sighted U-131 on the surface and Walker ordered a Martlet to attack while Stork, with Pentstemon and the three destroyers, made their best speed to the location. The Martlet pilot dived towards the U-boat and both opened fire at the same time, the Martlet being shot down and the pilot killed. The British ships opened fire at extreme range, U-131 was driven to the surface and sunk. Observers saw the crew of U-131 abandon the vessel before it sank at  Survivors said that they had been shadowing the convoy (claiming to have spent the previous night inside the convoy, homing other U-boats) and had been the U-boat attacked earlier.

On the night of  the U-boats attacked again but failed to torpedo any ships; U-107 was forced under water by Pentstemon and after a failed torpedo attack, U-67 was forced to retire by Convolvulus. At  on 18 December, Stanley gained an Asdic contact  and several ships dropped fifty depth charges. After thirty minutes U-434 surfaced and the crew abandoned ship just before it rolled over and sank north of Madeira,  of the crew being rescued and taken prisoner. Before noon, the radar on Audacity indicated two aircraft and Martlets were scrambled to intercept but the guns on both aircraft jammed and the Condors escaped. The rest of the day was quiet but the Admiralty signalled that three more U-boats were en route. In the early hours of  Stanley sighted U-574 astern at  sent a sighting report, was hit by a torpedo and blew up. Stork following behind, swung behind the stern of Stanley, gained an Asdic contact and dropped a pattern of depth charges, then turned after  to attack again.

A U-boat shot to the surface  ahead and a chase began; Walker tried to ram the U-boat but found that it could turn inside the turning circle of Stork nearly as fast. The ship fired on the U-boat, illuminated it with snowflakes and managed to ram it just forward of the conning tower, scraping over the hull of the submarine. As the U-boat emerged from under the stern, depth charges set for shallow were dropped, blowing up the U-boat. The bows of Stork were crushed and bent sideways and the Asdic dome under the hull was smashed. Soon after, U-108 torpedoed Ruckinge, which was abandoned and sunk later by Samphire. Focke-Wulf Condors arrived, one was shot down in another head-on attack and a second aircraft was damaged.

19–21 December

At  a Condor appeared to shadow the convoy and a Martlet chased it away before returning for lack of fuel. In the afternoon a Martlet spotted two U-boats and the convoy made an emergency turn. The U-boats were forced to submerge and Martlets patrolled overhead keeping them down for as long as their fuel lasted. It was so dark that the aircraft were guided to the flight deck with hand torches and again the night was quiet. U-107 maintained contact and the wolf pack was joined by U-71, U-567 (commanded by leading ace Engelbert Endrass), and U-751 from Bordeaux and the three original wolf pack boats U-67, U-107 and U-108 re-joined  by 21 December. On 21 December 802 NAS could only keep three Martlets operational, take-off and landing was dangerous in the heavy swell and the pilots were very tired. After the last patrol, the commander of Audacity ordered the ship out of the convoy  to the starboard as usual but no escorts could be spared. At  during the night of 21/22 December, a ship at the rear of the convoy was torpedoed by U-751 and nearby ships fired snowflakes, illuminating the area to both sides. U-567 saw the silhouette of Audacity at close range and at  torpedoed Audacity, which began to sink at the stern. Two more torpedoes from U-751 hit the carrier, a big explosion blew off the front end and the ship began to sink at the head.

22–23 December

At  on the night of  U-567 was sunk by depth charges from Deptford, two hours after gaining an Asdic contact; Deptford then collided with Stork, damaging them both. U-67 fired torpedoes at a CAM ship but missed. The Liberator turned for home with minimal fuel but next day the convoy came into range of continuous air support. On 23 December, Dönitz, shaken by the loss of five U-boats and the lack of success against the convoy, called off the attack and U-67, U-107, U-108 and U-751 returned to bases in France.

Aftermath
Despite the loss of Audacity and the three other ships, the safe arrival of 30 ships and the destruction of three U-boats (U-127 was not included and U-567 not confirmed until after the war) was judged to be an outstanding victory. It also confirmed Walker as the Royal Navy's foremost expert in anti-submarine warfare. The loss of five of the nine U-boats and Endrass, one of the most experienced U-boat commanders, was considered a grievous blow by Dönitz; his loss was concealed from the U-boat men for several weeks.

Order of battle

Allied forces
HG 76 comprised 32 merchant and 17 warships

Merchant ships
A total of 32 merchant vessels joined the convoy. (Data from Arnold Hague Convoy Database, unless specified.)

Convoy escorts
A series of armed military ships escorted the convoy at various times during its journey.

Axis forces
 was assembled on 14 December 1941, comprising seven U-boats. It was reinforced on 21 December by a further three. Four U-boats were destroyed attacking the convoy and another by the Gibraltar Strike Force.

Notes

Footnotes

References

Further reading

External links
 HG 76 at convoyweb
 HG 76 at uboat.net

North Atlantic convoys of World War II
C